Sing Your Song is a 2011 documentary that tells the story of Harry Belafonte. The film recounts his life and legacy, not only as a great entertainer, but as an important activist in the Civil Rights Movement.

This inspirational biographical film begins with Belafonte's birth into poverty in Harlem in 1927, and childhood years in Jamaica, sent there by his immigrant mother. Director Susanne Rostock takes the viewer through his discovery of theater and training as an actor as a young man, and on to his career and success as a singer.

The film shows not only Belafonte's remarkable success as a singer and actor, but also his true passion for social change. The film outlines some highlights of his entertainment career, but is more focused on how he helped change the world in other ways: marching with the Rev. Martin Luther King Jr. in the civil-rights era; working against apartheid in South Africa; fighting hunger through his instrumental work with USA for Africa; and, most recently, working to combat gang violence through programs with inner-city youth.

In an interview about the film, Belafonte discussed his activism from Civil Rights to poverty in Africa.

The film won an award in section "American Docs" on the 2. American Film Festival.

At the 2011 Vancouver International Film Festival, Sing Your Song won the Most Popular Nonfiction Film Award, which is based on ballots cast by audiences at the festival.

Belafonte presented the film as the Closing Night selection of Maryland Film Festival 2011.

The film advanced to the final 15 contenders for the Academy Award for Best Documentary Feature but was not nominated.

On January 10, 2012, REACT to FILM screened Sing Your Song at the Museum of Modern Art in Manhattan, NY, and moderated a Q&A with Belafonte.

References

External links
 
 
 Q&A about the film with Gina Belafonte at Vimeo
 News article (The Globe and Mail)
 News article (The Vancouver Sun)

American biographical films
Documentary films about singers
Documentary films about actors
American documentary films
2011 films
2011 documentary films
Documentary films about African Americans
2010s English-language films
2010s American films